Break In is a sports simulation video game  by Naxat Soft in 1989 for the PC Engine and released only in Japan. The pool (pocket billiards) simulator was re-released on Nintendo's Wii Virtual Console in all nations in 2008. It was later released for the Wii U Virtual Console.

Gameplay
The game simulates playing pool. There are six modes to choose from and up to six players can play together on the Virtual Console release.

Reception
IGN rated the game 5.5 of 10, citing broken English text, and very simple graphics and gameplay. The game received 3 out of 5 stars from VC-Reviews, who said that the game has a wide variety of pool games to choose from and who thought it included everything a pool fan would need to be satisfied for the short term.

References

1989 video games
TurboGrafx-16 games
Video games developed in Japan
Virtual Console games
Virtual Console games for Wii U
Cue sports video games
Kaga Create games
Multiplayer and single-player video games
Japan-exclusive video games